Otto Yamaoka (April 25, 1904 – June 5, 1967) was an American actor and businessman who worked in Hollywood primarily during the 1930s. He was one of only a handful of Japanese-descended actors working in the industry at the time. His sister, Iris, was an actress.

Biography 
Otto was born in Seattle, Washington, to Ototaka Yamaoka and Jho Watanabe.

The family moved to Los Angeles in the 1920s, and he and his sister Iris both developed an interest in acting; both primarily played smaller roles. His brother, George Yamaoka, became a prominent lawyer.

Otto's career in Hollywood ended around 1940, and he then began working as an importer in the Los Angeles area. The Yamaoka family was sent to the Heart Mountain internment camp in Wyoming during World War II following the signing of Executive Order 9066.

Partial filmography 

 The Ship from Shanghai (1930) - Shanghai Nightclub Patron (uncredited)
 The Benson Murder Case (1930) - Sam (uncredited)
 The Hot Heiress (1931) - Chinese Waiter (uncredited)
 The Black Camel (1931) - Kashimo
 The Hatchet Man (1932) - Chung Ho (uncredited)
 Westward Passage (1932) - Chong (uncredited)
 War Correspondent (1932) - Bandit (uncredited)
 The Racing Strain (1932) - Togo
 Midnight Mary (1933) - Chinese Proprietor (uncredited)
 Morning Glory (1933) - Servant (uncredited)
 Before Midnight (1933) - Kono
 The Sin of Nora Moran (1933) - Kito - John Grant's Houseboy (uncredited)
 We're Rich Again (1934) - Fugi
 Student Tour (1934) - Casino Patron (uncredited)
 Limehouse Blues (1934) - Chinese Waiter on Boat (uncredited)
 Death Flies East (1935) - Japanese Chauffeur (uncredited)
 The Wedding Night (1935) - Taka (uncredited)
 The Affair of Susan (1935) - Spieler (uncredited)
 Petticoat Fever (1936) - Kimo
 Rhythm on the Range (1936) - Chinese Houseboy (uncredited)
 Hollywood Boulevard (1936) - Thomas (uncredited)
 Libeled Lady (1936) - Ching
 Easy to Take (1936) - Japanese Instructor (uncredited)
 Night Waitress (1936) - Fong
 Criminal Lawyer (1937) - Mitzu - Brandon's House Boy (uncredited)
 Thin Ice (1937) - Japanese Reporter (uncredited)
 Song of the City (1937) - Wilbur - Paul's Butler (uncredited)
 Stand-In (1937) - Quintain's Houseboy (uncredited)
 Next Time I Marry (1938) - Joe - Nancy's Butler (uncredited)
 Trouble in Sundown (1939) - Foo Yung
 Two Girls on Broadway (1940) - Ito
 The Letter (1940) - Bartender at Party (uncredited) (final film role)

References 

American male film actors
American male actors
American male actors of Japanese descent
American film actors of Asian descent
Japanese-American internees
American people of Japanese descent
American businesspeople
1904 births
1967 deaths